René-Marie-Charles Poirier (born 1802 in Redon) was a French clergyman and bishop for the Roman Catholic Diocese of Roseau. He was ordained in 1827. He was appointed bishop in 1858. He died in 1878.

References 

1802 births
1878 deaths
French Roman Catholic bishops
People from Redon, Ille-et-Vilaine
Roman Catholic bishops of Roseau